Lee Ha-yi (born September 23, 1996), known by her stage name Lee Hi, is a South Korean singer and songwriter. She first garnered attention as the runner-up of K-pop Star 1. She debuted with single "1, 2, 3, 4" on October 28, 2012 and reached number one with first week sales of 667,549 downloads. Her first full-length album First Love was released in two parts, part 1 on March 7, 2013 and part 2 on March 28, 2013.

In 2020, she signed to hip-hop R&B record label AOMG where she released the studio album 4 Only (2021).

Early life
Lee Ha-yi was born on September 23, 1996 in Bucheon, Gyeonggi. In December 2011, Lee auditioned for SBS reality survival program K-pop Star, where she finished as runner-up behind Park Ji-min. Soon after she was signed to YG Entertainment by Yang Hyun-suk. Ahead of her debut, she was featured on label mate Epik High's single "It's Cold", which was released on October 8, 2012.

Career

2012–2015: Career beginnings and Hi Suhyun
On October 24, 2012, it was announced Lee would be debuting as a solo artist under the stage name, "Lee Hi", with digital single "1, 2, 3, 4" on October 28. Lee's first music show appearance was on SBS' Inkigayo on November 4, soon after claiming her first music show win on November 8 through Mnet's M Countdown. The song charted number one on the monthly Gaon Digital Chart for November, thus earning her the Song of the Year - November award from Gaon Chart K-Pop Awards. Following success of debut single "1,2,3,4", Lee released a second digital single written by Park Jin-young titled "Scarecrow" on November 22.

On March 2, 2013, YGE revealed Lee Hi's debut album First Love, would be released digitally on March 7 consisting of five tracks with lead single "It's Over", and physical release on March 28 with ten tracks including lead single "Rose". Promotions began with first stage at SBS' K-pop Star 2 on March 10. In December 2013, it was revealed Lee Hi and 2NE1's Park Bom would debut as the sub-unit "BOM&HI". They released the digital single "All I Want For Christmas Is You", a cover of Mariah Carey's song, on December 20. In November 2014, Lee and Akdong Musician's Lee Su-hyun formed the sub-unit Hi Suhyun and released digital single "I'm Different" featuring iKON's Bobby. The duo's first stage was at SBS' Inkigayo on November 16, following their first win on November 23.

2016–2018: Career breakthrough
On March 9, 2016, Lee released half album Seoulite with lead singles "Breathe" and "Hold My Hand", where "Breathe" went on to winning her the Digital Bonsang award at the 31st Golden Disk Awards. Lee began promotions for both singles on Mnet's M! Countdown on March 10. On April 20, Seoulite was released as a studio album with lead single "My Star". Among the tracks, Lee participated in writing and composing the song "Passing By". On May 28, Lee featured on Gill's single "Refrigerator" alongside Verbal Jint. On September 19, SBS drama Moon Lovers: Scarlet Heart Ryeo released Epik High and Lee's soundtrack "Can You Hear My Heart", following Lee's soundtrack "My Love" on October 3.  On December 31, Lee appeared on MBC's Infinite Challenge Hip-hop & History special as a featured guest for Yoo Jae-suk and Dok2's stage.

On February 28, 2017, Lee featured on Code Kunst's single "X" from studio album Muggles Mansion. On March 28, Lee featured on Dok2's single "On & On" off studio album Reborn, where she participated in writing and composing. On June 17 & 18, SBS' K-pop Star held a Kpop Star and Friends concert as a wrap up for the franchise after six seasons of airing, performances included Lee Hi and label-mate Akdong Musician. On August 20, Lee appeared on SBS' Party People where she shared she suffered from minor panic attacks in the past, thus the creation of her 2016 hit single "Breathe". On October 23, Lee featured on Epik High's single "Here Come the Regrets" from studio album We've Done Something Wonderful. On March 21, 2018 Lee's Japanese debut album was released, thus embarking on her Japan tour at stops including Tokyo and Osaka. On October 19, Lee collaborated with the film Bohemian Rhapsody and released a cover soundtrack of Queen's "Bohemian Rhapsody".

2019–present: Career resurgence and label changes
On January 15, 2019, Lee released digital single "XI" with Code Kunst, the track was sung live for the first time on MBC Dreaming Radio. Lee Hi made a comeback with her EP, 24°C, on May 30, 2019. The lead single, "No One" (featuring B.I), topped all charts in South Korea, including Melon, Genie and Mnet. Among the tracks, she released the self-written and produced song "20Min". Lee received her first music show win for single "No One" through Mnet's M Countdown on June 6. Following the end of Lee's contract with YG Entertainment, on December 31, it was revealed Lee had made the decision to not renew.

In June 2020, Lee joined as a cast member for the fourth installment of JTBC show Begin Again from episode 4 to 6. On July 22, 2020, AOMG revealed that they had signed an exclusive contract with Lee Hi and released her comeback single "Holo." "Holo" peaked at number 7 on the Gaon Digital Chart and won R&B Track of the Year at the Korean Hip-hop Awards.

On September 9, 2021, Lee released her third studio album 4 Only. In March 2022, she won R&B Track of the Year for "Only" at the Korean Hip-hop Awards.

Endorsements
On March 9, 2017 Lee teamed up with highly known cosmetics brand MAC's Future Forward Collection in creating a special edition matte red lipstick under her stage name Lee Hi. The lipstick was available worldwide in store and online in respective countries. On July 28, Lee held a fan sign with MAC at Lotte World Mall, Seoul, South Korea. In collaboration with MAC and magazine Marie Claire, on October 15 Lee held an event showcasing stages of her songs as well as covers of other artists.

Discography

Studio albums
 First Love (2013)
 Seoulite (2016)
 Lee Hi Japan Debut Album (2018)
 4 Only (2021)

Filmography

Television shows

Concerts and tours
Lee Hi 1st Concert "Secret Live RE HI" (2013)
Lee Hi 1st Japan Tour (2018)

Awards and nominations

References

External links

 Lee Hi on AOMG

YG Entertainment artists
South Korean women pop singers
South Korean rhythm and blues singers
South Korean female idols
1996 births
Living people
K-pop Star participants
School of Performing Arts Seoul alumni
Korean Music Award winners
People from Bucheon
21st-century South Korean women singers
South Korean mezzo-sopranos